Laseronella is a small genus of sea snails, pyramidellid gastropod mollusks. This genus is currently placed in the subfamily Chrysallidinae of the family Odostomiidae. It has both recent and fossil (Tertiary) members. The name is a replacement name for  Pandorella  Laseron, 1951, that is preoccupied by "Pandorella" Conrad, 1862, another mollusk.

Life habits
Little is known about the biology of the members of this genus. As is true of most members of the Pyramidellidae sensu lato, they are most likely to be ectoparasites.

Species
Species within the genus Laseronella include:
 Laseronella declivita (Laseron, 1951) (Type species) (as Pandorella declivita)
 ...

References
 
 

Pyramidellidae

de:Pyramidelloidea